The Ghaziabad Nagar Nigam (GNN), also known as Ghaziabad Municipal Corporation (GMC) is the civic body that governs Ghaziabad city. Established under the Uttar Pradesh Municipal Corporation Act-1959, it is responsible for the civic infrastructure and administration of the city.It covers area equal to 210 square kilometres.

Wards
Ghaziabad Municipal corporation is divided into 5 zones - City Zone, Kavi Nagar Zone, Vijay Nagar Zone, Mohan Nagar Zone and Vasundhara Zone. The Municipal Corporation comprises 100 wards, with councillors elected from each ward. The local elections to all wards was last held in 2017.

Departments

 PUBLIC WORKS DEPARTMENT
 I.T. DEPARTMENT
 PROPERTY TAX DEPARTMENT
 HEALTH DEPARTMENT
 STREET LIGHT DEPARTMENT
 WATER WORKS DEPARTMENT
 LAW
 GARDEN / HORTICULTURE
 SWACHH BHARAT MISSION

List of Brand Ambassadors for Swachh Bharat Mission

Total number of voters

List of mayors

List of Current Municipal Councillors

Mayor Election results

References

Ghaziabad, Uttar Pradesh
Municipal corporations in Uttar Pradesh